Elba Township is a township in Winona County, Minnesota, United States. The population was 311 at the 2010 census.

History
Elba Township was organized in 1858, and named after Elba, in Italy. Two properties in the township are listed on the National Register of Historic Places: the circa-1858 William Hemmelberg House and the New Deal structures of Whitewater State Park, built 1934–1941.

Geography

Demographics
As of the census of 2000, there were 263 people, 91 households, and 74 families residing in the township. The population density was 7.9 people per square mile (3.0/km2). There were 108 housing units at an average density of 3.2/sq mi (1.3/km2). The racial makeup of the township was 98.10% White and 1.90% African American.

There were 91 households, out of which 39.6% had children under the age of 18 living with them, 80.2% were married couples living together, 1.1% had a female householder with no husband present, and 17.6% were non-families. 17.6% of all households were made up of individuals, and 7.7% had someone living alone who was 65 years of age or older. The average household size was 2.89 and the average family size was 3.27.

In the township the population was spread out, with 30.0% under the age of 18, 8.0% from 18 to 24, 24.0% from 25 to 44, 29.7% from 45 to 64, and 8.4% who were 65 years of age or older. The median age was 40 years. For every 100 females, there were 113.8 males. For every 100 females age 18 and over, there were 106.7 males.

The median income for a household in the township was $43,750, and the median income for a family was $60,000. Males had a median income of $37,000 versus $23,750 for females. The per capita income for the township was $18,246. About 2.8% of families and 3.7% of the population were below the poverty line, including 3.5% of those under the age of 18 and 8.3% of those 65 and older.

References

Townships in Winona County, Minnesota
Townships in Minnesota